The Comedian is a 2016 American comedy-drama film directed by Taylor Hackford and written by Lewis Friedman, Richard LaGravenese, Art Linson, and Jeff Ross. The film stars Robert De Niro, Leslie Mann, Danny DeVito, Edie Falco, Veronica Ferres, Charles Grodin, Cloris Leachman, Patti LuPone, Greer Barnes and Harvey Keitel.

The film had its world premiere at the AFI Fest on November 11, 2016, and was released by Sony Pictures Classics on December 9, 2016. The film opened to negative reviews from critics.

Plot
Jackie (Robert De Niro) is a comic icon, attempting to reinvent himself despite his audience only wanting to know him as a television character he played earlier in his career.

He attends a comedy club for nostalgia night at Governor's Comedy Club in Levittown, New York (near Hicksville, New York), hosted by Jimmie Walker. After accosting an audience member, Jackie is sentenced to 30 days in jail. During his 100 hours of community service he meets Harmony Schiltz (Leslie Mann), who works at a soup kitchen as part of her community service.

Cast

Production 

At one point it was hoped that Martin Scorsese would direct the film. However, this did not come to pass. Instead, Mike Newell joined on as the film's director, only to be replaced a few months later by Taylor Hackford. Jennifer Aniston was at one point attached to play Harmony Schiltz but was later replaced by Leslie Mann.

Principal photography on the film began on February 21, 2016, in New York City, and other locations including Manhattan.

Release
In October 2016, Sony Pictures Classics acquired U.S distribution rights to the film, with plans to release the film in December, in order to qualify for awards. The film had its world premiere at the AFI Fest on November 11, 2016. It hit theaters in a limited release on December 9, 2016, with a wide opening on February 3, 2017. It was originally scheduled to open on January 13, but was pushed back to February 3.

Reception

Box office
In North America, The Comedian was released alongside Rings and The Space Between Us, and was projected to gross $1–3 million from about 800 theaters in its opening weekend. It ended up debuting to just $892,021, finishing 21st at the box office. Deadline Hollywood attributed the film's poor opening to negative critical reception and lack of award buzz, similar to Gold the week prior.

Critical response
On review aggregator website Rotten Tomatoes the film holds an approval rating of 24% based on 109 reviews, with an average rating of 4.7/10. The site's critical consensus reads, "The Comedian boasts an incredibly talented cast, but they're put to poor use in an aimless rom-com whose handful of memorable moments never add up to a compelling story." On Metacritic, the film has a score of 40 out of 100, based on 37 critics, indicating "mixed or average reviews".

Accolades

References

External links 
 
 
 
 

2016 films
American comedy-drama films
2016 comedy-drama films
Films scored by Terence Blanchard
Films about comedians
Films shot in New York City
Films about theatre
Films set in a theatre
Films set in New York City
Films directed by Taylor Hackford
Films produced by Art Linson
Cinelou Films films
Sony Pictures Classics films
2010s English-language films
2010s American films